Yang Ying (born October 31, 1994) is a Chinese female curler.

Teams

Women's

Mixed

Mixed doubles

References

External links

Yang Ying - Curling World Cup player profile (web archive)

Living people
1994 births
Sportspeople from Harbin
Chinese female curlers

Competitors at the 2019 Winter Universiade
Curlers at the 2012 Winter Youth Olympics
Asian Games medalists in curling
Curlers at the 2017 Asian Winter Games
Medalists at the 2017 Asian Winter Games
Asian Games gold medalists for China
Place of birth missing (living people)
21st-century Chinese women